Great Dunmow is a historic market town and civil parish in the Uttlesford district of Essex, England. It is situated on the north of the A120 road, approximately midway between Bishop's Stortford and Braintree, five miles east of London Stansted Airport.

Originally the site of a Roman settlement on Stane Street, the town thrived during the Middle Ages.  Many buildings survive from this period, including a 16th-century town hall. Dunmow means "Meadow on the Hill". The settlement was variously referred to as Dunmow Magna, Much Dunmow, or most commonly Great Dunmow. As of 2021, Robert Nicholson is Emeritus Mayor of Great Dunmow.

History

A Roman small town developed on the junction between Stane Street and the Roman roads which ran northeast to southwest from Sudbury to London and northwest to southeast from Cambridge to Chelmsford. The main settlement area spread westwards from the road junction, with cemeteries on the outskirts. There was a second Roman settlement at Church End immediately to the north of present-day Great Dunmow. The site likely included a rural Roman Temple.

Between the occupation by the Romans and the time of the Saxons, the town acquired its name – in AD951 it was named Dunemowe, and later Dommawe. In the Domesday Book of 1086, Dunmow had seven manors, some of which still exist, in name at least – including Bigods, Newton Hall (seat of the Henniker baronets), Merks Hall, Minchins and Shingle Hall. The earliest record of a church in the town is in 1045, and in 1197 Geoffrey de Dunmow was rector.

In medieval times, Dunmow was a thriving commercial centre, with market charters granted in 1253 and two fairs held annually until the 19th century. Dunmow's Corporation was granted in 1555 and confirmed in 1590.

Both Roman settlements were reoccupied during the Saxon period, at Great Dunmow in the seventh century and at Church End in the later Saxon period. The earliest medieval settlement appears to have been a continuation of the late Saxon settlement at Church End, where the parish church is located. The granting of a market charter may mark the time of the movement of the main focus of settlement from Church End to the High Street and market-place. The medieval and post-medieval development of Great Dunmow is reflected both in the surviving built heritage, which includes 167 Listed Buildings, and the below-ground archaeology.

Great Dunmow was located on the GHQ Line, a series of defences and concrete Pillboxes built to hinder an anticipated German invasion in the Second World War. Many of these still remain and are clearly visible along the Chelmer Valley, one being located on the west bank of the River Chelmer in meadows behind the Dourdan Pavilion and recreation ground.

Easton Lodge became RAF Great Dunmow in the war and for a time was home to squadrons from the USAAF and the RAF.  The site of the former airfield is now owned by Land Securities who hope to build a development including around 9,000 homes alongside significant supporting community, commercial and retail infrastructure, intending to call it Easton Park. The crews of two aircraft based at RAF Great Dunmow were killed in aircraft crashes very close to the town on 20 March and 21 November 1945.

A nuclear bunker was built on the edge of the village, on land compulsorily purchased in 1959. Used by the Royal Army Ordnance Corps until the 1980s, it was returned to its original owner in 1991 and sold on privately in 2005.

Layout 
The town museum, the Maltings Museum, is situated on Mill Lane and covers local history. Great Dunmow is also the Home of Talliston House & Gardens, an ex-council house transformed by owner John Tarrow (née Trevillian) into 'Britain's most extraordinary home' (The Times). The house and gardens have been open to the public since 2015 and includes 13 fantasy locations, each set in a different time and place.

Transport
Great Dunmow is no longer served directly by the National Rail network.

Until 1952, the town was served by Dunmow railway station on the  Bishop's Stortford-Braintree branch line; the line was opened to passengers on 22 February 1869 and closed on 3 March 1952. The line continued to be used for freight trains and occasional excursions, closing in stages with the final section to Easton Lodge closing on 17 February 1972. It is now possible to walk or cycle in either direction along the former track bed to Braintree station or to the edge of Bishop's Stortford.

As the crow flies, the town is just under  from Stansted Airport. 

The M11 motorway passes nearby, to the west of the town. The A120, from the M11 to Braintree, by-passes the town; the former route has now been re-designated the B1256. The latter itself was a bypass, built on the route of the old railway line and station. Until the 1970s, the A120 went through Great Dunmow town centre.

Flitch Trials
The town is well known for its four-yearly ritual of the "Flitch Trials", in which couples must convince a jury of six local bachelors and six local maidens that, for a year and a day, they have never wished themselves unwed. If successful the couple are paraded along the High Street and receive a flitch of bacon.  The last flitch trials were held in the town in the summer of 2022, two years late because of the coronavirus pandemic, and the next will be held in 2024, after which the four-yearly cycle will resume. The custom is ancient, and is mentioned in the Wife of Bath's Prologue and Tale in Chaucer's The Canterbury Tales. It acts as a major plot point in the 1952 film Made in Heaven, starring Petula Clark and David Tomlinson.

Twin town
Great Dunmow is twinned with Dourdan in France.

Notable people

 Evelyn Anthony (3 July 1926 - 25 September 2018) – award-winning novelist and writer
 Anne Line (1567 – 27 February 1601) – Catholic martyr executed during the reign of Elizabeth I for harbouring a priest in The Clock House, The Causeway, where she was a housekeeper.
 Lionel Lukin (18 May 1742 – 16 February 1834) – considered by some to have been the inventor of the unsinkable lifeboat, designs for which he tested on the Doctor's Pond.
 Sir George Beaumont, 7th Baronet (6 November 1753 – 7 February 1827) – British art patron and amateur painter. Played a crucial part in the creation of London's National Gallery by making the first bequest of paintings.
 Julian Byng, 1st Viscount Byng of Vimy GCB GCMG MVO (11 September 1862  – 6 June 1935) was a British Army officer who served as Governor General of Canada – the 12th since Canadian Confederation – and, upon returning to the UK, served as the Commissioner of the Metropolitan Police. Newton Hall was his first house, though he lived there for two years.
 Toke Townley (6 November 1912 in Great Dunmow - 27 September 1984 in Leeds), was an English actor who appeared as a regular character in the soap opera Emmerdale Farm.
 Francis Arthur Jefferson VC (18 August 1921 – 4 September 1982) was stationed in Dunmow after WW2 and was married in the village.
 Glen Murphy MBE, English Actor/Producer received MBE while living on a farm in the area in 2007.
 Tommy Walsh celebrity builder, star of Ground Force, Challenge Tommy Walsh and Tommy Walsh's Eco House.
 Liam Howlett (musician) from The Prodigy lives in Great Dunmow
 Keith Flint (musician) (17 September 1969 –  4 March 2019), member of The Prodigy, final home and place of death.
 Alex Lynn racing driver currently with Formula E.
 Jonathan Albon, longdistance runner

See also
 The Hundred Parishes

References

External links
 Dunmow flitch history
 

 
Towns in Essex
Civil parishes in Essex